Keweser Xamixidin (born 18 March 1999) is a Chinese footballer currently playing as a forward for Xinjiang Tianshan Leopard.

Club career
Born in Bole, Xinjiang, Xamixidin moved to Portugal in 2018 to join the 'B' team of Gondomar.

Career statistics

Club
.

Notes

References

1999 births
Living people
Footballers from Xinjiang
Chinese footballers
China youth international footballers
Association football forwards
Campeonato de Portugal (league) players
China League One players
Gondomar S.C. players
Wuhan F.C. players
Xinjiang Tianshan Leopard F.C. players
Chinese expatriate footballers
Chinese expatriate sportspeople in Portugal
Expatriate footballers in Portugal